Laura Joffe Numeroff (born July 14, 1953) is an American author and illustrator of children's books who is best known as the author of If You Give a Mouse a Cookie.

Early life
Numeroff was born in Brooklyn, New York, the youngest of three girls. As a child, Numeroff was an avid reader, and by the age of 9 she had decided she wanted to be a writer when she grew up.  She credits her current profession to two specific childhood favorites, claiming that they "are the reason" she is a writer: E. B. White's Stuart Little and Kay Thompson's Eloise.

When it came time for Numeroff to go to college, she followed her older sister Emily to Pratt Institute. At Pratt, an arts institute, she didn't study writing but chose to follow her sister's footsteps and major in fashion.  Soon enough Numeroff realized fashion "wasn't for her", returned to her childhood dream of becoming a writer and took a writing and illustrating for children class.  A homework assignment prompted Numeroff to write and illustrate Amy for Short, about the tallest girl in third grade.  Before graduating from Pratt in 1975, Amy For Short was published by Macmillan Publishing, launching Laura Joffe Numeroff's writing career.

Career
Phoebe Dexter Has Harriet Peterson's Sniffles, published in January 1977, tells the woeful tale of Phoebe Dexter who is stuck at home because she is sick. Upset that she is missing all the happenings of her school day, Phoebe busies herself pretending she is a dog and eventually playing Go Fish with her grandmother who comes over to keep her company. The book is both written and illustrated by Numeroff.

Numeroff's first 9 books were both written and illustrated by Numeroff herself. When the early manuscript for If You Give A Mouse A Cookie was bought by HarperCollins after nine rejections, Numeroff's editor chose Felicia Bond to illustrate. When asked about her earlier endeavors into illustrations during an interview, she mentioned that though she loves drawing, she decided her "strength was in writing and not in illustration" and said "I don't think I would illustrate a whole book anymore at this point".

Numeroff has worked with numerous illustrators including Lynn Munsinger, David McPhail, Tim Bowers, Nate Evans, Joe Mathieu, Sal Murdocca, Sharleen Collicott, and Felicia Bond; Felicia Bond is the illustrator of the If You Give . . . series. 

Her autobiography, If You Give an Author a Pencil, was published in 2003; it is written at a second grade reading level so that it is also accessible to children. Numeroff's books have been published in many languages. Numeroff resides in Los Angeles, California.

In 2022, Numeroff became involved with Village Book Builders, a non-profit organization dedicated to building libraries in under-served global communities.  Numeroff funded the creation of a library in Malawi and attended the opening ceremony where she quickly fell in love with the local children and is working with the organization to raise funds to build more libraries around the world, with the ultimate goal of providing education to children in poor communities.

Series

If You Give...
If You Give a Mouse a Cookie, published in 1985 and illustrated by Felicia Bond, was the book that launched the hit If You Give... series. It was rejected by publishers nine times before it was finally accepted by Harper. These stories use a circular story format, presenting to the reader a chain of events. At the end of the story, the reader discovers that the characters have ended up at the same transaction that they started with. It is also considered a cautionary tale where the moral is that when given something out of kindness, people will continue to ask for more. The entire story is an "If  , then ___" scenario . If You Give a Mouse a Cookie spawned numerous books that expanded from the mouse to include the characters of a moose, a cat, a pig, and a dog.

What...Do Best
The first book in this series by Numeroff, What Mommies Do Best/What Daddies Do Best, published in April 2008, was illustrated, in watercolors, by Lynn Munsinger. The entire series was written for children ages 4 – 8.
This children's book is a two part story. On one side of the book is What Mommies Do Best. This book demonstrates many of the great things that mommies do like: give piggyback rides, teach children how to ride a bicycle, and sew a button on a teddy bear.
Following What Mommies Do Best, the book can be flipped to reveal What Daddies Do Best. This side illustrates all the special things that daddy does with his children. The stories are identical. Both mommy and daddy do the same things in each book. Subsequent books concern grandparents and aunts and uncles.
What Mommies Do Best/ What Daddies Do Best uses different animals in brightly colored illustrations to show young children the things parents do that make them so special. Each illustration shows a different animal parent with their young child.

The Jellybeans
Bitsy, a pig wearing purple, loves to draw, color, paint and make art. Emily, a dog wearing pink, loves to dance. Anna, a rabbit wearing yellow, loves to read books. Nicole, a cat wearing blue, loves to play soccer. The first letters of their names spell the word "BEAN". That is because they love jellybeans. Their favorite place is a candy store called Petunia's, where they love to share jellybeans. Just as jellybeans are different flavors but go well together, the girls are all different but get along great – and so they call themselves the JELLYBEANS.

Other works
An avid animal lover, Laura had always wanted to write a book about service dogs.In 2016, Numeroff and co-creator Sean Hanrahan released Raising a Hero, illustrated by Lynn Munsinger. The children's book about a young boy raising a puppy to become a service dog in order to help children with disabilities. Proceeds from Raising a Hero supports Canine Companions, a non-profit devoted to training service dogs for people with disabilities. 

Laura Numeroff's Ten Step Guide to Living with Your Monster, illustrated by Nate Evans, was published in April 2002 for children ages 4 – 8. Instead of being afraid of them this story instructs readers how to make a monster a good pet. This guide outlines Numeroff's ten basic steps to buying, naming, and dealing with your pet monster. There are things you should know like choosing a monster that can tie its shoes, how to take your monster to the vet, not to choose a monster who tries to eat your shirt, and that "Fluffy" is not a good name for a monster. With each step is a bright, colorful illustration to help you choose your own pet monster.
A portion of the profits from Laura Numeroff's Ten Step Guide to Living with Your Monster were donated to The Michael J. Fox Foundation for Parkinson's Research.

Awards
Laura Bush invited Numeroff and Bond to the White House to be honored for the If You Give... series at the "Laura Bush Celebrates American Authors" event. She has won numerous awards as author of the If You Give... Series including: 
 California Young Reader Medal-1988
 Colorado Children's Book Award-1988
 Georgia Children's Picture Storybook Award-1988
 Nevada Young Readers' Award-1989
 Buckeye Children's Book Award-1989
 Quill Award (If You Give a Pig a Party)-2006

Numeroff has also won awards for her individual stories including:
 The Milner Award-2007

Works

The If You Give ... series
Illustrated by Felicia Bond
If You Give a Mouse a Cookie (1985)
If You Give a Moose a Muffin (1991)
If You Give a Pig a Pancake (1998)
The Best Mouse Cookie (1999)
If You Take a Mouse to the Movies (2000)
If You Take a Mouse to School (2002)
If You Give a Pig a Party (2005)
Merry Christmas, Mouse! (2007)
Time for School, Mouse! (2008)
If You Give a Cat a Cupcake (2008)
Happy Valentine's Day, Mouse! (2009)
Happy Easter, Mouse! (2010)
If You Give a Dog a Donut (2011)
It's Pumpkin Day, Mouse! (2012)
Happy Birthday, Mouse! (2012)
If You Give a Mouse a Brownie (2016)

The What People Do Best series

What Mommies Do Best/What Daddies Do Best
What Grandmas Do Best/What Grandpas Do Best
What Aunts Do Best/What Uncles Do Best
What Sisters Do Best/What Brothers Do Best

The Jellybeans series
Written by Nate Evans, illustrated by Lynn Munsinger
The Jellybeans and the Big Dance (Mar 1, 2008)
The Jellybeans and the Big Book Bonanza (Mar 1, 2010)
The Jellybeans and the Big Camp Kickoff (Mar 1, 2011)
The Jellybeans and the Big Art Adventure (Mar 1, 2012)
The Jellybeans Love to Dance (Mar 12, 2013)
The Jellybeans Love to Read (Mar 11, 2014)

Other titles

 If You Give a Man a Cookie

Raising a Hero (with Sean Hanrahan)
Beatrice Doesn't Want to
Sometimes I Wonder If Poodles Like Noodles
Monster Munchies
The Chicken Sisters
Laura Numeroff's Ten Step Guide to Living with Your Monster
Dogs Don't Wear Sneakers
Chimps Don't Wear Glasses
Two For Stew
Why a Disguise?
When Sheep Sleep
Emily's Bunch (with Alice Richter)
Walter
Amy for Short
Does Grandma Have an Elmo Elephant Jungle Kit
You Can't Put Braces on Spaces (with Alice Richter)
Phoebe Dexter Has Harriet Peterson's Sniffles
If You Give an Author a Pencil
Sherman Crunchley (with Nate Evans)

References

External links
 
 Laura Numeroff at Kidsreads.com
 Mouse Cookie Books Interactives

1953 births
Living people
American children's book illustrators
American children's writers
Writers from Brooklyn
American women children's writers
20th-century American writers
21st-century American writers
American women illustrators
20th-century American women writers
21st-century American women writers